Fonio, also sometimes called findi or acha, is the term for two cultivated grasses in the genus Digitaria that are notable crops in parts of West Africa. They are millets with small grains. 

Fonio is a nutritious food with a favorable taste. It is consumed mainly in West African countries, where it is also cultivated. The global fonio market was estimated at 721,400 tonnes in 2020. Guinea annually produces the most fonio in the world, accounting for over 75% of the world's production in 2019. The name fonio (borrowed into English from French) is from Wolof foño.

Types

White fonio
White fonio, Digitaria exilis, also called "hungry rice" by Europeans, is the most common of a diverse group of wild and domesticated Digitaria species that are harvested in the savannas of West Africa. Fonio has the smallest seeds of all species of millet. It has potential to improve nutrition, boost food security, foster rural development, and support sustainable use of the land.

Nutritious, gluten-free, and high in dietary fiber, fonio is one of the world's fastest-growing cereals, reaching maturity in as little as six to eight weeks. The grains are used to make porridge, couscous, bread, and beer.

Black fonio
Black fonio, D. iburua, also known as iburu, is a similar crop grown in several countries of West Africa, particularly Nigeria, Togo, and Benin. Like white fonio, it is nutritious, fast-growing, and has the benefit of maturing before other grains, allowing for harvest during the "hungry season." However, it contains considerably more protein compared to D. exilis.

Black fonio is mostly cultivated in rural communities and is rarely sold commercially, even in West African cities.

Cultivation and processing 
Fonio grows in dry climates without irrigation, and is unlikely to be a successful crop in humid regions. It is planted in light (sandy to stony) soils, and will grow in poor soil. The growth cycle ranges from 70–130 days, depending on variety. Fonio has  carbon fixation, like many other grasses. They are medium in height. The ploidy level for the species range from diploid (2n), tetraploid (4n), to hexaploid (6n).

Fonio is labor-intensive to harvest and process. Men and boys use sickles to cut down the fonio, which women then gather into sheaves and set out to dry. Then it is threshed by spreading it on straw mats or tarps, typically by women using their feet. The grains are then washed by hand.

The small grains make it difficult and time-consuming to remove the husk. Traditional methods include pounding it in a mortar with sand, and then separating the grains and sand, or "popping" it over a flame and then pounding it, which yields a toasted-color grain (a technique used among the Akposso). The invention of a simple fonio husking machine offers an easier mechanical way to dehusk.

Commercialization in the West 
Fonio has been relatively unknown in the West until recently, when companies in Europe and the United States began to import the grain from West Africa, often citing its ecological and nutritional benefits in their marketing.

European Union 
In December 2018, the European Commission approved commercialization of fonio as a novel food in the European Union, after submission by the Italian company Obà Food to manufacture and market new food products. These products include fonio pasta, revealing a desire to change fonio to be more recognizable to the European palate.

United States 
In the United States, Yolélé Foods, led by Senegalese-American chef Pierre Thiam, started importing and selling fonio in 2017. Thiam hopes to not only introduce Americans to the grain, but support sustainable and traditional agriculture in Burkina Faso, Ghana, Mali and Senegal. What is considered to be a peasant's food in West Africa is now sold in luxury grocery stores in the United States.

However, Thiam positions his project as part of a larger movement to elevate the economic power of African farmers, who for centuries have been suppressed by Western hegemony in the global food system.

See also

 Eragrostis tef,

References

Further reading
 
 

Digitaria
Millets
Grasses of Africa
Crops originating from Africa
Plant common names